Kasper Blond (July 10, 1889 – September 20, 1964) was an Austrian surgeon, inventor and writer who proposed an alternative theory of cancer.

Biography

Blond was born in Czernowitz, Bukovina. During World War I, Blond served in the Austrian Army. He was captured and imprisoned by Russians in Siberia but escaped through Persia and Turkey, back to Vienna. He was educated at the University of Vienna, where he graduated M.D. in 1917. He worked as a surgeon at the Vienna General Hospital. During World War II, Blond fled Austria and worked at hospitals in Britain. In 1940, he qualified L.R.C.P and L.R.F.P.S. He worked as a senior surgeon at Whipps Cross University Hospital until 1943.

He conducted experiments on the pathology of the liver, which were published in 1928 and 1930. In 1950, he co-authored the book The Liver: Porta Malorum, which proposed the hypothesis that many diseases and disorders such as allergies, cholecystitis, nephritis, jaundice, piles are caused by a malfunctioning liver. Their hypothesis was described as too dogmatic by critics. A review in the California Medicine journal noted that "as soon as they present their principal hypothesis, they speak like religious fanatics with a body of dogma to be taken on faith without support of scientific fact."

In 1923, Blond and Hans Heidler (1889–1955) invented the Blond-Heidler saw, an obstetric tool used to remove a dead fetus. The saw has been used in cases of fetal decapitation without maternal trauma.

Blond died in London.

Cancer theory

Blond developed a theory of cancer which he wrote about in his book The Liver and Cancer, first published in 1954 with a second edition in 1960.  Blond argued that the basis of all malignant disease is a mutation of somatic tissues caused by chronic liver damage. He believed that 98% of all cancers in adults are of alimentary origin. His hypothesis was that cancer is a nutritional disease and is caused by liver damage.
 
Blond believed that cancer treatment requires the healing of liver damage. He argued that if the liver detoxifies correctly then cancer cannot develop because it thrives only on toxic products of digestion. His suggestions of treatment opposed any radiation therapy or surgery. He regarded "cancer prevention, a problem of dietary control" and recommended a vegetarian diet as therapy. He cited cases of cancer patients being successfully treated with vegetable juices, yoghurt, raw vegetables and fruit.

Pathologist J. H. O. Earle in The British Medical Journal noted that:

Physician Louis Lasagna negatively reviewed the book, stating that it promoted his theory that cancer is due to a sick liver but that was about all and it was "rather a disjointed and unconvincing bit of hobbyhorse riding". Physician Grant E. Ward who reviewed the book, stated that further research was needed to prove if "nutritional toxins" cause cancer but his hypothesis was impressive enough to warrant study.

Blond is referenced by Max Gerson, in A Cancer Therapy: Results of 50 Cases (1958). After the 1960s, Blond's book was largely forgotten.

Publications

Haemorrhoids And Their Treatment: The Varicose Syndrome Of The Rectum (1940)
The Liver: Porta Malorum (The Gateway to Disease) (with David Haler, 1950)
The Liver and Cancer: A New Cancer Theory (with a foreword by E. Stanley Lee, 1960)

References

1889 births
1964 deaths
Alternative cancer treatment advocates
20th-century Austrian inventors
Austrian surgeons
Cancer researchers
University of Vienna alumni
20th-century surgeons